Al-e Darvish (also Romanized as Āl-e Darvīsh and Āl Darvīsh) is a village in Khamir Rural District, in the Central District of Khamir County, Hormozgan Province, Iran. At the 2006 census, its population was 228, in 58 families.

References 

Populated places in Khamir County